The Indian Journal of Pharmaceutical Sciences is a bimonthly peer-reviewed open-access medical journal covering pharmaceutics, biopharmaceutics, pharmaceutical chemistry, pharmacognosy, pharmacology, pharmaceutical analysis, pharmacy practice, and clinical and hospital pharmacy. Since March 2016, it is published on behalf of the Indian Pharmaceutical Association by OMICS International, which is included in Jeffrey Beall's list of "potential, possible, or probable predatory publishers". OMICS International replaced Medknow Publications, which had published the journal for 10 years. It was established in 1939 as the Indian Journal of Pharmacy, with M.L. Schroff as founding editor-in-chief.

Abstracting and indexing 
The journal is abstracted and indexed in:

According to the Journal Citation Reports, the journal has a 2015 impact factor of 0.762.

References

External links 
 

Open access journals
Bimonthly journals
English-language journals
Pharmacology journals
Publications established in 1939
1939 establishments in India
Academic journals associated with learned and professional societies of India
OMICS Publishing Group academic journals